Mylothris rubricosta, the eastern swamp dotted border or streaked dotted border, is a butterfly in the family Pieridae. It is found in Sudan, Ethiopia, Uganda, Rwanda, Burundi, the Democratic Republic of the Congo, Kenya, Tanzania, Malawi, Zambia, Mozambique, Botswana and Zimbabwe. The habitat consists of papyrus swamps.

Adults have a weak flight and stay close to the ground. Adults feed on the flower nectar of Persicaria barbata. They are on wing from August to March.

The larvae feed on Persicaria barbata species.

Subspecies 
Mylothris rubricosta rubricosta (southern Sudan, Ethiopia, Uganda, Rwanda, Burundi, Democratic Republic of the Congo, Kenya, Tanzania, Zambia, Mozambique)
Mylothris rubricosta attenuata Talbot, 1944 (eastern Tanzania, Malawi, north-western Zimbabwe, Botswana)
Mylothris rubricosta pulchra Berger, 1981 (Democratic Republic of the Congo, western Tanzania)

References 

Seitz, A. Die Gross-Schmetterlinge der Erde 13: Die Afrikanischen Tagfalter. Plate XIII 11

Butterflies described in 1890
Pierini
Butterflies of Africa